The 2009 Chase for the Sprint Cup was the ten-race playoff that determined the champion of the 2009 NASCAR Sprint Cup Series, contested among the top twelve drivers following the Chevy Rock and Roll 400 on September 12 at Richmond International Raceway.  The entire chase was broadcast on ABC in the USA and TSN 2 in Canada.

Format
For the second year, the twelve drivers who qualified for the Chase had their point totals reset to 5,000 points, with a ten-point bonus for each race they won prior to the Chase.  The driver who earns the most points at the end of the Chase will be declared the 2009 series champion.

Changes
This year's changes were where the ten races will be.  Atlanta Motor Speedway's fall date, the Pep Boys Auto 500, was switched to the Labor Day weekend, and Auto Club Speedway, which hosts the Pepsi 500, took the space in the race schedule.  Talladega Superspeedway's date, the AMP Energy 500 was in return, moved to Atlanta's date with Auto Club moving into Talladega's original position.

Races

‡ – Ineligible for the Chase as he did not finish in Top 12.

Qualified Drivers
The 12 drivers who have qualified for the chase after the Chevy Rock and Roll 400
Tony Stewart (Stewart Haas Racing #14 Chevrolet)
Jimmie Johnson (Hendrick Motorsports #48 Chevrolet)
Jeff Gordon (Hendrick Motorsports #24 Chevrolet)
Denny Hamlin (Joe Gibbs Racing #11 Toyota)
Carl Edwards (Roush Fenway Racing #99 Ford)
Kasey Kahne (Richard Petty Motorsports #9 Dodge)
Kurt Busch (Penske Racing #2 Dodge)
Juan Pablo Montoya (Earnhardt Ganassi Racing #42 Chevrolet)
Ryan Newman (Stewart Haas Racing #39 Chevrolet)
Mark Martin (Hendrick Motorsports #5 Chevrolet)
Greg Biffle (Roush Fenway Racing #16 Ford)
Brian Vickers (Red Bull Racing Team #83 Toyota)

Standings

Results
NOTE: Standings in Cup points before the race in parentheses.

Race One: 2009 Sylvania 300

Results:
 Mark Martin (1)
 Denny Hamlin (4)
 Juan Pablo Montoya (11)
 Jimmie Johnson (3)
 Kyle Busch
 Kurt Busch (6)
 Ryan Newman (7)
 Elliott Sadler
 Greg Biffle (12)
 Clint Bowyer

Other Chase drivers:
11. Brian Vickers (8)
14. Tony Stewart (2)
15. Jeff Gordon (6)
17. Carl Edwards (9)
38. Kasey Kahne (5)

Point Standings:
 Mark Martin          5,230 points
 Jimmie Johnson     – 35
 Denny Hamlin       – 35 (Third by tiebreaker)
 Juan Pablo Montoya – 55
 Kurt Busch         – 65
 Tony Stewart       – 76
 Ryan Newman        – 79
 Brian Vickers      – 90
 Greg Biffle        – 92
 Jeff Gordon        – 102
 Carl Edwards       – 113
 Kasey Kahne        – 161

Race Two: 2009 AAA 400

Results:
 Jimmie Johnson (2)
 Mark Martin (1)
 Matt Kenseth
 Juan Pablo Montoya (4)
 Kurt Busch (5)
 Jeff Gordon (10)
 A. J. Allmendinger
 Kasey Kahne (12)
 Tony Stewart (6)
 Ryan Newman (7)

Other Chase drivers:
11. Carl Edwards (11)
13. Greg Biffle (9)
18. Brian Vickers (8)
22. Denny Hamlin (3)

Point Standings:
 Mark Martin          5,400 points
 Jimmie Johnson     – 10
 Juan Pablo Montoya – 65
 Kurt Busch         – 75
 Tony Stewart       – 106
 Denny Hamlin       – 108
 Ryan Newman        – 110
 Jeff Gordon        – 122
 Greg Biffle        – 138
 Brian Vickers      – 151
 Carl Edwards       – 153
 Kasey Kahne        – 189

Race Three: 2009 Price Chopper 400

Results:
 Tony Stewart (5)
 Jeff Gordon (8)
 Greg Biffle (9)
 Juan Pablo Montoya (4)
 Denny Hamlin (6)
 Kasey Kahne (12)
 Mark Martin (1)
 David Reutimann
 Jimmie Johnson (2)
 Carl Edwards (11)

Other Chase drivers:
11. Kurt Busch (4)
22. Ryan Newman (7)
37. Brian Vickers (10)

Point Standings:
 Mark Martin          5,551 points
 Jimmie Johnson     – 18
 Juan Pablo Montoya – 51
 Tony Stewart       – 67
 Kurt Busch         – 91
 Denny Hamlin       – 99
 Jeff Gordon        – 103
 Greg Biffle        – 114
 Ryan Newman        – 164
 Carl Edwards       – 165
 Kasey Kahne        – 190
 Brian Vickers      – 250

Race Four: 2009 Pepsi 500

Results:
 Jimmie Johnson (2)
 Jeff Gordon (7)
 Juan Pablo Montoya (3)
 Mark Martin (1)
 Tony Stewart (4)
 Carl Edwards (10)
 David Ragan
 Kurt Busch (5)
 Clint Bowyer
 Kevin Harvick

Other Chase drivers:
13. Ryan Newman (9)
20. Greg Biffle (8)
29. Brian Vickers (12)
34. Kasey Kahne (11)
37. Denny Hamlin (6)

Point Standings:
 Jimmie Johnson       5728 points
 Mark Martin        – 12
 Juan Pablo Montoya – 58
 Tony Stewart       – 84
 Jeff Gordon        – 105
 Kurt Busch         – 121
 Greg Biffle        – 188
 Carl Edwards       – 192
 Denny Hamlin       – 219
 Ryan Newman        – 223
 Kasey Kahne        – 306
 Brian Vickers      – 351

Race Five: 2009 NASCAR Banking 500 Only from Bank of America

Results:
 Jimmie Johnson (1)
 Matt Kenseth
 Kasey Kahne (11)
 Jeff Gordon (5)
 Joey Logano
 Clint Bowyer
 Casey Mears
 Kyle Busch
 Martin Truex, Jr.
 Kurt Busch (6)

Other Chase drivers:
11. Ryan Newman (10)
13. Tony Stewart (4)
16. Greg Biffle (7)
17. Mark Martin (2)
34. Brian Vickers (12)
35. Juan Pablo Montoya (3)
39. Carl Edwards (8)
42. Denny Hamlin (9)

Point Standings:
 Jimmie Johnson       5933 points
 Mark Martin        – 90
 Jeff Gordon        – 135
 Tony Stewart       – 155
 Kurt Busch         – 177
 Juan Pablo Montoya – 195
 Greg Biffle        – 268
 Ryan Newman        – 288
 Kasey Kahne        – 331
 Carl Edwards       – 341
 Denny Hamlin       – 372
 Brian Vickers      – 485

Race Six: 2009 TUMS Fast Relief 500

Results:
 Denny Hamlin (11)
 Jimmie Johnson (1)
 Juan Pablo Montoya (6)
 Kyle Busch
 Jeff Gordon (3)
 Jamie McMurray
 Ryan Newman (8)
 Mark Martin (2)
 Tony Stewart (4)
 Kevin Harvick

Other Chase drivers:
11. Brian Vickers (12)
17. Kurt Busch (5)
20. Carl Edwards (10)
25. Greg Biffle (7)
32. Kasey Kahne (9)

Point Standings:
Jimmie Johnson		  6098 points
Mark Martin		– 118
Jeff Gordon		– 150
Tony Stewart		– 192
Juan Pablo Montoya	– 200
Kurt Busch		– 240
Ryan Newman		– 312
Greg Biffle		– 350
Denny Hamlin		– 352
Carl Edwards		– 413
Kasey Kahne		– 439
Brian Vickers 		– 530

Race Seven: 2009 AMP Energy 500

Results:
 Jamie McMurray
 Kasey Kahne (11)
 Joey Logano
 Greg Biffle (8)
 Jeff Burton
 Jimmie Johnson (1)
 Michael Waltrip
 Brad Keselowski
 Elliott Sadler
 Bobby Labonte

Other Chase drivers:
13. Brian Vickers (12)
14. Carl Edwards (10)
19. Juan Pablo Montoya (5)
20. Jeff Gordon (3)
28. Mark Martin (2)
30. Kurt Busch (6)
35. Tony Stewart (4)
36. Ryan Newman (7)
38. Denny Hamlin (9)

Point Standings:
Jimmie Johnson		  6248 points
Mark Martin		–184
Jeff Gordon		–192
Juan Pablo Montoya	–239
Tony Stewart   	–279
Kurt Busch		–312
Greg Biffle		–340
Ryan Newman		–402
Kasey Kahne		–414
Carl Edwards		–437
Denny Hamlin		–448
Brian Vickers 		–551